Marcel Hendrickx (21 April 1925 – 15 February 2008) was a Belgian racing cyclist. He rode in the 1949 Tour de France.

References

External links

1925 births
2008 deaths
Belgian male cyclists
People from Houthalen-Helchteren
Cyclists from Limburg (Belgium)
20th-century Belgian people